Jeremy Beale (born 4 October 1994) is an Australian tennis player.

Beale has a career high ATP singles ranking of 459 achieved on 8 October 2018. He also has a career high doubles ranking of 224 achieved on 22 December 2018.

Beale has won 1 ATP Challenger doubles title in 2018.

On 20 September 2021, Beale improved 100 places to number 684 after claiming his first ITF Futures singles title since 2018.

ATP Challengers and ITF Futures finals

Singles: (2–4)

Doubles: (17–6)

References

External links
 
 

1994 births
Living people
Australian male tennis players
Tennis players from Melbourne
21st-century Australian people
People from Preston, Victoria